York Street/Freemason is a Tide Light Rail station in Norfolk, Virginia. It opened in August 2011 and is situated on York Street between Yarmouth and Dunmore Streets in Downtown Norfolk. 

The station is directly adjacent to the Norfolk YMCA and Belmont at Freemason and is close to the Freemason Historic District and Chrysler Museum of Art.

References

External links 
York Street / Freemason station

Tide Light Rail stations
Railway stations in the United States opened in 2011
2011 establishments in Virginia